Parchicola is a genus of flea beetles in the family Chrysomelidae. There are at least 4 described species, found in North America and the Neotropics.

Selected species
 Parchicola androsensis (Blake 1946)
 Parchicola iris (Olivier, 1808)
 Parchicola religata (Jacquelin du Val 1857)
 Parchicola tibialis (Olivier, 1808)

References

External links

 

Alticini
Chrysomelidae genera
Articles created by Qbugbot